Pirates Down the Street is a 2020 Dutch film directed by Pim van Hoeve. The film is based on the children's book of the same name written by Reggie Naus.

The film won the Golden Film award after having sold 100,000 tickets. It was the fifth highest-grossing Dutch film of 2020. It was also the sixth best visited Dutch film of 2020.

Filming began in July 2019.

In July 2021, a sequel was announced.

References

External links 
 

2020 films
2020s Dutch-language films
Dutch children's films
Films based on Dutch novels
Films set on ships
Pirate films
Films shot in Amsterdam
Films directed by Pim van Hoeve